Matthew David Tupman (born November 25, 1979) is a retired professional baseball catcher.

Amateur career
Tupman played for Plymouth State University his freshman year before transferring to University of Massachusetts Lowell. He hit .414 his freshman year at Plymouth. He batted .363 with 8 home runs, 73 runs, 18 doubles and 50 RBIs his junior year and was named second-team a Division II All-American.

Professional career

Kansas City Royals
Before the  season Tupman played in the Caribbean Series in the Dominican Republic. Tupman was called up by the Kansas City Royals on May 16, when John Buck was placed on the paternity list after his wife gave birth prematurely. Tupman made his major league debut as a pinch-hitter for Jimmy Gobble against the Florida Marlins on May 18, 2008. Tupman recorded a hit off Kevin Gregg, but was the first out in a double play in the next plate appearance. The next day, Buck was activated from the paternity list and Tupman returned to the minor leagues.

He became a free agent at the end of the 2008 season, but re-signed to a minor league contract on November 30. On June 23,  Tupman was released from the Royals organization.

Arizona Diamondbacks
On July 6, 2009, Tupman was signed to a minor league contract by the Arizona Diamondbacks. He was granted free agency at the end of the '09 season. He was suspended for violating Minor League Baseball's drug policy. It was his second positive test.

Lancaster Barnstormers
After spending 2010 out of baseball, in 2011, Tupman signed with the Lancaster Barnstormers of the Atlantic League of Professional Baseball. He played in 57 games in Lancaster before becoming a free agent at seasons end.

References

External links

A Play-by-play log of Tupman's major league debut

1979 births
Living people
Major League Baseball catchers
Baseball players from New Hampshire
Spokane Indians players
Wilmington Blue Rocks players
Wichita Wranglers players
Omaha Royals players
Kansas City Royals players
Mobile BayBears players
Burlington Bees players
Lancaster Barnstormers players
Plymouth State Panthers baseball players
UMass Lowell River Hawks baseball players